Cesaltino Mendes Santos, known as Tino (born 18 April 1988) is a Cape Verdean football player.

Club career
He made his professional debut in the Segunda Liga for Leixões on 8 January 2017 in a game against União da Madeira.

References

External links
 Soccerway Profile

1988 births
Footballers from Santiago, Cape Verde
Living people
Cape Verdean footballers
Cape Verdean expatriate footballers
Expatriate footballers in Portugal
G.D. Vitória de Sernache players
Leixões S.C. players
Liga Portugal 2 players
Casa Pia A.C. players
S.U. Sintrense players
Association football forwards